George Marston may refer to:

 George Marston (Massachusetts politician) (1821–1883), American politician, and Massachusetts attorney general
 George Marston (California politician) (1850–1946), American politician, department store owner, and philanthropist
 George Marston (artist) (1882–1940), English artist who twice accompanied Sir Ernest Shackleton on expeditions to Antarctic